Kavasila (also Καβάσιλας) is a village in the municipal unit of Gastouni, Elis, Greece. Its population is around 1,500. It is situated in a flat rural area, on the right bank of the river Pineios, at about  elevation. Kavasila had a train station on the line from Patras to Kalamata via Pyrgos. A branch line to Vartholomio and Kyllini was shut down around 2001. The Greek National Road 9 (Patras - Pyrgos) passes east of the village.

Population history

See also
List of settlements in Elis

References

External links
GTP - Kavasila

Gastouni
Populated places in Elis